Unfolding may refer to:

Mathematics 
 Unfolding (functions), of a manifold
 Unfolding (geometry), of a polyhedron
 Deconvolution

Other uses 
 Unfolding (DSP implementation)
 Unfolding (music), in Schenkerian analysis
 Unfolding (sculpture), by Bernhard Heiliger located near Milwaukee, Wisconsin, United States
 Equilibrium unfolding, in biochemistry

See also 
 Unfold (disambiguation)
 Unfoldment (disambiguation)